Grizzly Mountain is located in Crook County, Central Oregon near the city of Prineville. It is composed of welded tuff and is a part of the Crooked River caldera.

References

External links 
 

Mountains of Crook County, Oregon
Mountains of Oregon
Volcanoes of Crook County, Oregon
Volcanoes of Oregon